Koloneia (a hellenization of the Latin Colonia) can refer to:

 Koloneia on the Lykos in Pontus, a Byzantine military centre and metropolitan bishopric
 Koloneia (theme), a Byzantine province centered in and named after the above
 Koloneia in Cappadocia, a Byzantine aplekton and bishopric
 Koloneia, the Greek name of Kolonjë District in Albania

See also
 Kolonjë (placename)
Kolonia, in the Federated States of Micronesia